Mokamtala Secondary School is a private secondary school located in Shimulia Union of Jhikargacha Upazila, Jessore District, Bangladesh. It was founded in 1968 by Mohammad Shawkat ali Moral.

References

Schools in Jessore District
High schools in Bangladesh
Educational institutions established in 1968
1968 establishments in East Pakistan